Gbenga Arokoyo (born 1 November 1992) is a Nigerian footballer who plays for Swedish club Umeå FC as a defender.

Career
Arokoyo was signed by Kwara United from Kwara Football Academy in 2010. During his time at the club he was selected for the Nigeria national under-20 football team. In early 2012 a delegation from Swedish club Mjällby AIF travelled to see him on location in Nigeria and in February they officially signed him. In April 2013 an Allsvenskan game against Djurgårdens IF was suspended after Arokoyo got hit by a pear thrown by a Djurgården supporter.

On 2 August 2016, Portland Timbers of Major League Soccer announced that they had signed Arokoyo. He played in one game for the Timbers and one game for their second team, Portland Timbers 2, in 2016. During training before the 2017 season, he suffered an Achilles tendon tear, missing the subsequent season.

On 13 December 2017, Arokoyo was traded along with Darlington Nagbe to Atlanta United FC.

On 15 February 2021, Arokoyo signed with Umeå FC in the Swedish third-tier Ettan.

Personal life
In his youth Arokoyo wanted to become a doctor but since his family could not afford to pay for the education he instead chose to become a professional footballer.

References

External links

1992 births
Living people
Yoruba sportspeople
Sportspeople from Kogi State
Mjällby AIF players
Kalmar FF players
Umeå FC players
Association football defenders
Nigerian footballers
Nigeria international footballers
Nigeria under-20 international footballers
Allsvenskan players
Ettan Fotboll players
Expatriate footballers in Sweden
Nigerian expatriate sportspeople in Sweden
Expatriate footballers in Turkey
Nigerian expatriate sportspeople in Turkey
Expatriate soccer players in the United States
Gaziantepspor footballers
Süper Lig players
Nigerian expatriate footballers
Portland Timbers players
Portland Timbers 2 players
Major League Soccer players
USL Championship players